Karen I. Simonsen was appointed a judge of the Court of Queen's Bench of Manitoba on December 10, 2004.  She replaced Mr. Justice Marc Monnin, who was appointed Chief Justice.

Madam Justice Simonsen received a Bachelor of Laws from the University of Manitoba in 1981.  She was admitted to the Manitoba Bar in 1982.

At the time of her appointment, she was a partner with the firm of Thompson Dorfman Sweatman in Winnipeg.  She practised primarily in civil litigation with an emphasis on personal injury, insurance and workers' compensation matters.

References
 Government of Canada News Release (accessed August 1, 2007)

Judges in Manitoba
University of Manitoba alumni
Canadian women judges
Living people
Year of birth missing (living people)